The Peschanaya is a left tributary of the Ob. It flows through Altai Krai and Altai Republic in Siberia.

Geography
It originates approximately 25 kilometers south-east of the village of Besh-Ozek on the slopes Seminsky Range at an altitude of about 1700 m. It joins the Ob 13 km below the confluence of the Biya and Katun.

References

Rivers of Altai Krai
Rivers of the Altai Republic